Lipid droplets, also referred to as lipid bodies, oil bodies or adiposomes, are lipid-rich cellular organelles that regulate the storage and hydrolysis of neutral lipids and are found largely in the adipose tissue. They also serve as a reservoir for cholesterol and acyl-glycerols for membrane formation and maintenance. Lipid droplets are found in all eukaryotic organisms and store a large portion of lipids in mammalian adipocytes. Initially, these lipid droplets were considered to merely serve as fat depots, but since the discovery in the 1990s of proteins in the lipid droplet coat that regulate lipid droplet dynamics and lipid metabolism, lipid droplets are seen as highly dynamic organelles that play a very important role in the regulation of intracellular lipid storage and lipid metabolism. The role of lipid droplets outside of lipid and cholesterol storage has recently begun to be elucidated and includes a close association to inflammatory responses through the synthesis and metabolism of eicosanoids and to metabolic disorders such as obesity, cancer, and atherosclerosis. In non-adipocytes, lipid droplets are known to play a role in protection from lipotoxicity by storage of fatty acids in the form of neutral triacylglycerol, which consists of three fatty acids bound to glycerol. Alternatively, fatty acids can be converted to lipid intermediates like diacylglycerol (DAG), ceramides and fatty acyl-CoAs. These lipid intermediates can impair insulin signaling, which is referred to as lipid-induced insulin resistance and lipotoxicity. Lipid droplets also serve as platforms for protein binding and degradation. Finally, lipid droplets are known to be exploited by pathogens such as the hepatitis C virus, the dengue virus and Chlamydia trachomatis among others.

Structure

Lipid droplets are composed of a neutral lipid core consisting mainly of triacylglycerols (TAGs) and cholesteryl esters surrounded by a phospholipid monolayer. The surface of lipid droplets is decorated by a number of proteins which are involved in the regulation of lipid metabolism. The first and best-characterized family of lipid droplet coat proteins is the perilipin protein family, consisting of five proteins. These include perilipin 1 (PLIN1), perilipin 2 (PLIN2/ ADRP), perilipin 3 (PLIN3/ TIP47), perilipin 4 (PLIN4/ S3-12) and perilipin 5 (PLIN5/ OXPAT/ LSDP5/ MLDP).  Proteomics studies have elucidated the association of many other families of proteins to the lipid surface including proteins involved in membrane trafficking, vesicle docking, endocytosis and exocytosis.  Analysis of the lipid composition of lipid droplets has revealed the presence of a diverse set of phospholipid species; phosphatidylcholine and phosphatidylethanolamine are the most abundant, followed by phosphatidylinositol.

Lipid droplets vary greatly in size, ranging from 20 to 40 nm to 100 um. In adipocytes, lipid bodies tend to be larger and they may compose the majority of the cell, while in other cells they may only be induced under certain conditions and are considerably smaller in size.

Formation

Lipid droplets bud off the membrane of the endoplasmic reticulum. Initially, a lens is formed by accumulation of TAGs between the two layers of its phospholipid membrane. Nascent lipid droplets may grow by diffusion of fatty acids, endocytosis of sterols, or fusion of smaller lipid droplets through the aid of SNARE proteins. The budding of lipid droplets is promoted by an asymmetric accumulation of phospholipids that decrease surface tension towards the cytosol. Lipid droplets have also been observed to be created by the fission of existing lipid droplets, though this is thought to be less common than de novo formation.

The formation of lipid droplets from the endoplasmic reticulum begins with the synthesis of the neutral lipids to be transported. The manufacture of TAGs from diacylglycerol (by the addition of a fatty acyl chain) is catalyzed by the DGAT proteins, though the extent to which these and other proteins are required depends on cell type. Neither DGAT1 nor DGAT2 is singularly essential for TAG synthesis or droplet formation, though mammalian cells lacking both cannot form lipid droplets and have severely stunted TAG synthesis. DGAT1, which seems to prefer exogenous fatty acid substrates, is not essential for life; DGAT2, which seems to prefer endogenously synthesized fatty acids, is.

In non-adipocytes, lipid storage, lipid droplet synthesis and lipid droplet growth can be induced by various stimuli including growth factors, long-chain unsaturated fatty acids (including oleic acid and arachidonic acid), oxidative stress and inflammatory stimuli such bacterial lipopolysaccharides, various microbial pathogens, platelet-activating factor, eicosanoids, and cytokines.

An example is the endocannabinoids that are unsaturated fatty acid derivatives, which mainly are considered to be synthesised “on demand” from phospholipid precursors residing in the cell membrane, but may also be synthesised and stored in intracellular lipid droplets and released from those stores under appropriate conditions.

It is possible to observe the formation of lipid droplets, live and label-free, using label-free live cell imaging.

Gallery

SUNIL

Oil body
Adipocyte
Lipolysis
Seipin

References

External links

Biochemistry
Metabolism